Thori Yvette Staples Bryan (born April 17, 1974) is an American retired soccer defender who previously played for the United States women's national soccer team and the Bay Area CyberRays in the Women's United Soccer Association.

Early life
Bryan grew up in Joppatowne, Maryland and played soccer for the Columbia Crusaders for five years. She won state championships in long jump, 400-meter dash and 800-meter run.

North Carolina State University
In 1992, her first season with North Carolina State University, she started all 22 games and was named the ACC Rookie of the Year in 1992. During her time at North Carolina, she was a three-time All-Atlantic Coast Conference (ACC) and All-South Region selection.

Bryan was nominated for the Missouri Athletic Club National Player of the Year award in 1994 and 1995. During her senior year, she started all 22 regular season games while the Wolfpack posted an 18–4–0 record and No. 9 national ranking.

Playing career

Club
Staples-Bryan played for the San Jose CyberRays in the Women's United Soccer Association, the first professional soccer league in the United States, from 2001 to 2003 and was a key member of the 2001 Founders Cup Championship team. She was a first round pick and the first American player to be selected in the inaugural draft.

In 2008, after a more than four-year hiatus after the folding of the WUSA, she returned to
play with the Carolina Railhawks in the W-League.

International
Bryan made her first appearance for the United States women's national soccer team on March 11, 1993 in a game against Denmark. She would go on to earn 64 caps with the team from 1993 to 2003.

In 1994, she helped the team win the title at the CONCACAF Qualifying Championship in Montreal and qualify for the 1995 FIFA Women's World Championship and FIFA Women's World Championship in Sweden.

Bryan was a member of the 1995 Women's National Team that placed third at Sweden. She was an alternate on the 1996 Olympic Team.

In 2003, she was named by national team head coach, April Heinrichs, as one of the 20 players that would travel to China for the Four Nations Tournament.

Coaching career
Bryan was an assistant coach at Virginia Tech. She runs the Thori Bryan Soccer Academy in Wake Forest, North Carolina.

Personal life
Staples Bryan married Kip Bryan in 1998.

See also

 United States women's national soccer team
 Bay Area CyberRays
 Carolina Railhawks

References

External links
 Thori Staples Bryan FIFA Record
 
 Profile at Women's United Soccer Association

Living people
1974 births
Soccer players from Baltimore
NC State Wolfpack women's soccer players
American women's soccer players
San Jose CyberRays players
United States women's international soccer players
Women's United Soccer Association players
Fortuna Hjørring players
Women's association football defenders
Olympic gold medalists for the United States in soccer
Medalists at the 1996 Summer Olympics
Footballers at the 1996 Summer Olympics
1995 FIFA Women's World Cup players
Raleigh Wings players
Expatriate women's footballers in Denmark
American expatriate sportspeople in Denmark
Elitedivisionen players
USL W-League (1995–2015) players